Bazabur  is a Syrian village located in Ariha Nahiyah in Ariha District, Idlib.  According to the Syria Central Bureau of Statistics (CBS), Bazabur had a population of 1389 in the 2004 census.

References 

Populated places in Ariha District